Lord Richard Frederick Cavendish,   (31 January 1871 – 7 January 1946), known as Richard Cavendish until 1908, was a British aristocrat, author, magistrate, and politician.

Background and education
A prominent figure from the Cavendish family, he was a younger son of Lord Edward Cavendish, third son of the 7th Duke of Devonshire. The 8th Duke of Devonshire was his uncle and the 9th Duke of Devonshire his elder brother. His mother was Emma Elizabeth, daughter of the Hon. William Lascelles. He was educated at Eton and Trinity College, Cambridge, where he was a member of the Pitt Club.

Political career
Cavendish was elected in the 1895 general election as the Member of Parliament (MP) for North Lonsdale. He crossed the floor from being a supporter of the Liberal Unionists to being a member of the Liberal Party in 1904. Therefore, he was one of the few Liberal MPs who lost their seat in the 1906 election. In December 1908 he was appointed chairman of the Royal Commission on Systems of Election, with the mandate "to secure a fully representative character for popularly elected legislative bodies" and "to consider whether, and how far, they, or any of them, are capable of application in this country in regard to the existing electorate". The commission reported in 1910, recommending the abolition of two member constituencies "as soon as possible"; this was implemented. The commission also recommended the adoption of an alternative vote system, which was not implemented.

In 1911 Cavendish was on Prime Minister Asquith's list of peers in case the Parliament Act 1911 was not passed by the House of Lords and was admitted to the Privy Council in 1912. As President of the Royal Lancashire Agricultural Society, Cavendish visited Lancaster in 1925. He was the Lord of the Manor, residing at Holker Hall (where his descendants remain to this day) and owned the Swan Hotel at Newby Bridge. He was an active freemason and a keen golfer.

Family
Cavendish married Lady Moyra, daughter of William Beauclerk, 10th Duke of St Albans, in 1895. They had two sons and five daughters. Ordinarily, as the male-line grandson of a duke he would not be entitled to use the prefix "Lord" before his Christian name, but because his elder brother Victor Cavendish, succeeded as the 9th Duke of Devonshire in 1908, he was elevated to the rank of a son of a duke along with his younger brother Lord John Cavendish. His grandson Lord Cavendish of Furness is third in line to succeed his cousin Peregrine Cavendish, 12th Duke of Devonshire as Duke of Devonshire after William Cavendish, Earl of Burlington and his son.

References

External links 
 
 Royal Commission on Systems of Election
 His portraits at the National Portrait Gallery

1871 births
1946 deaths
Liberal Unionist Party MPs for English constituencies
Liberal Party (UK) MPs for English constituencies
Members of the Privy Council of the United Kingdom
Alumni of Trinity College, Cambridge
People educated at Eton College
Companions of the Order of the Bath
Companions of the Order of St Michael and St George
Deputy Lieutenants in England
English justices of the peace
Younger sons of dukes
UK MPs 1895–1900
UK MPs 1900–1906
Richard Cavendish